Artimpasa  was a complex androgynous Scythian goddess of fertility who possessed power over sovereignty and the priestly force. Artimpasa was the Scythian variant of the Iranian goddess Arti/Aṣ̌i.

Name

Artimpasa is often erroneously called Argimpasa due to a scribal corruption.

History

Origins
Artimpasa was the Scythian variant of the Iranian goddess /, who was a patron of fertility and marriage and a guardian of laws who represented material wealth in its various forms, including domestic animals, previous objects, and a plentiful descendance.

Thracian influences
There were outside influences on Artimpasa, such as from the Great Mother goddess Bendis of the Thracian neighbours of the Scythians, who like Artimpasa was a mistress of animals and a power-giver. The presence of these similarities between Artimpasa and however suggests that these aspects of Artimpasa had an indigenously Scythian/Balkan element and were not fully results of the undermentioned influence of ancient West Asian cults.

Western Asian influences
The ancient West Asian cults who influenced Artimpasa were those of -- during the long-period of Scythian presence in Western Asia in the 7th century BCE, especially in the latter's form worshipped at ʾAšqalōn of an androgynous vegetation-fertility goddess who had the ability to change men into women and women into men.

Artimpasa henceforth preserved many traits inherited from ʿAštart, and, reflecting influence from Levantine cults in which the Great Goddess was often accompanied by a minor semi-bestial goddess, it was from the ʿAštart-Aphroditē of ʾAšqalōn, to whom was affiliated a semi-human goddess subordinate to her in the form of ʿAtarʿatah, that was derived the affiliation of the Snake-Legged Goddess, who was also the Scythian equivalent of the semi-human goddess subordinate to the Great Goddess as well as the Scythian foremother and therefore the equivalent of ʿAtarʿatah, to Artimpasa. This affiliation was so close that the images of the two goddesses would almost merge, but nevertheless remained distinct from each other, and this distinction is more clear in how Artimpasa was assigned the role of the king's sexual partner (see below) and the divine power of the kings who granted royal power, but was not considered the foremother of the people, and in how neither the Bosporan kings of Sarmatian ancestry nor the Graeco-Roman authors' records assigned Aphroditē or Artimpasa as the Scythians' ancestor.

Persian influences
Other influences on Artimpasa include that of the fellow Iranian goddess Anāhitā, whose closeness to Arti enabled the merging of her traits into Artimpasa. The cult of Artimpasa had transformed into one of the divine patron of the royal dynasty by the 4th century BCE, reflecting the absorption of Anāhitā's role as a divine patroness of the king and a giver of royal power by Artimpasa, as well as the influence on Artimpasa of the role of the Levantine Great Goddesses as grantors of divine power to the king.

Cult

Functions
Artimpasa was a goddess of warfare, sovereignty, priestly force, fecundity, vegetation and fertility.

Regional variants

Like Artimpasa, Astara's  was a male deity who was a local form of Dargatavah and was identified with the Greek , named .

Greek identifications
Due to the assimilation by Artimpasa of the traits of Ištar-ʿAštart, the Greeks on the northern shores of the Black Sea identified Artimpasa with their own goddess  (Aphroditē Ourania) and the Scythians themselves in turn assimilated Aphroditē Ourania with Artimpasa. Due to this association, multiple depictions of Greek-style and Greek-made Aphroditē and   have been found in the tombs of Scythian nobles. The Greek author Hērodotos of Halikarnāssos would later also equate Artimpasa with the Greek goddess Aphroditē Ourania, who herself presided over productivity in the material world.

Artimpasa was also identified with the Greek goddess in the Bosporan Kingdom due to her warrior aspects.

Iconography

The winged Artimpasa
This imagery might have been influenced directly and indirectly (via the intermediary of orientalizing Greek art from Ionia) by the Levantine depictions of Inanna-Ištar, who was portrayed as winged as symbol of her being a celestial and warrior goddess, and was also represented as a  holding animals in both her hands or surrounded by animals, and whose warrior nature was shown in her representations as a Mistress of Animals holding weapons.

A Sarmatian  decorated with an image of a winged Aphroditē with her head decorated with leaves, and holding a small round object in one hand and a rosette in the other hand was found in the Yanchorak treasure from the 2nd to 1st centuries BCE. This  was part of a horse harness and the Sarmatians who copied a Greek representation of Aphroditē associated her image with their own goddess.

Another winged depiction of Artimpasa shows her as a winged goddess flanked by deer from a plate found in the  alongside a sceptre head shaped like the Snake-Legged Goddess affiliated to her. A possibly winged representation of Artimpasa was on a damaged bronze cart beam decoration from Krasnoye Znamya. That this portrayal of the goddess showed her within a radiate circle, implying she was also a solar goddess.

The seated Artimpasa
Although this composition has sometimes been identified as a representation of Tapatī́, the mirror the goddess holds is more fitting of Artimpasa's role as a goddess of fertility and sexuality and a patroness of the  soothsayers due to the mirror being a symbol of feminine principle, eroticism and fertility which played an important role in the wedding rites of Iranian peoples, as well as a magical object used for prophecy and shamanic rites (the Sarmatians buried their priestesses with mirrors). One pendant from the Kul-Oba kurgan depicts Artimpasa in the centre, with a spherical vessel to her right and an altar or incense burner to her left, representing the consecration by fire (which holds an important place in the marital rites of Iranian peoples) of the communion between the goddess and humanity.

To their right are a musician and two "cup-bearers", and to their left is a youth with a fan and two Scythians drinking from the same  (interpreted as "sworn brothers"), and two sacrificers of a ram. This scene is a representation of a sacred feast where the kneeling man, a worshipper or young god, is uniting with the goddess by drinking a holy beverage.

A similar artistic motif is that of a horseman facing Artimpasa. One depiction of this scene is from a famous Saka carpet from one of the Pazyryk kurgans in Siberia representing the seated Artimpasa with her right hand raised to her head and her left hand holding a blossoming branch, with a horseman facing her.

Another possible Siberian representation of Artimpasa can be found on two belt buckles depicting two dismounted horsemen, one of whom is holding the horses while the other lays in the lap of a goddess whose torso emerges from the earth and whose hair is interwoven with the branches of a tree above her head. This scene might depict the Scythian ritual sleep on the Earth and could be related to the relation between Artimpasa and the divine twins.

The bezel of the signet ring of the Scythian king Skula was decorated with the image of Artimpasa seated on a throne and holding a mirror in her right hand and a sceptre in her left hand, with  engraved near the figure of the goddess, and on whose band was inscribed in Greek , with Argotas being a former Scythian king from whom his descendant Skula inherited this ring.

Depictions of Astara with a horseman facing her have also been found in the Kuban region inhabited by these peoples:
a 4th century BCE  from the Merdzhany kurgan was decorated with a representation of the seated goddess holding a spherical vessel, with a seven-branched leafless tree (a Tree of Life possibly characterising this scene as a marriage ceremony) on one side of her throne, and a pole with a horse skull (symbolising the importance of horses and horse sacrifice in this goddess's cult) on it on the other side, while mounted god with a  approaches her – the scene represents this Sindo-Maeotian goddess and a local male deity in communion, possibly of marital nature. This scene is also parallel to the scenes of Artimpasa with a male partner, and the presence of the Tree of Life as well as the goddess's link to horses reflect her similarity with Artimpasa, and thus indicate close links between the Scythian and Sindo-Maeotian worship of the fertility and vegetation goddess.
The  hanging on the pole might be linked to the custom of the Massagetai described by Hērodotos of Halikarnāssos whereby a man desiring to have sexual intercourse with a woman would hang his  in front of her wagon before proceeding to the act; the hanging  in the Trekhbratniy kurgan relief might thus have been a symbol of sexual union or marriage, and its location near the carriage as well as the handclasp of the woman and the horseman might therefore hint that the scene showed a sacred marriage ceremony. This scene represented the apotheosis of a deceased noblewoman who participated in the worship of the Sindo-Maeotian goddess before her death, with her receiving the status of the goddess depicted in similar scenes alongside the hero after her death. The scene might alternatively have represented the Sindo-Maeotian equivalent of Artimpasa with the hero.

The goddess and the divine twins
One gold plate which decorated a priestess's headdress which was discovered in the 4th–3rd century BCE Karagodeuashkh kurgan depicting a Sindo-Maeotian form of Artimpasa is divided into three registers corresponding to the division of the universe into three levels of Scythian cosmology:

In the background, two beardless persons wearing a hood are standing.

The woman in the upper level of the plate was identified an Iranian deity representing , that is divine bliss, and assimilated with Tukhē, and the charioteer in the middle section has been identified with Gaiθāsūra.

The three divisions of the Karagodeuashkh plate have also been interpreted as representing the same goddess respectively reigning the world from heaven, driving the sun-chariot in the middle, and accepting the veneration of humans and blessing them in the lower section.

This scene therefore represented the Indo-European triad of the Great Goddess with the divine twins, itself related to the connection between the pre-Zoroastrian Anāhitā and the Nåŋhaⁱθiia twins, ultimately derived from the Indo-European theme of the divine twins as the companions of the Mother Goddess who flanked her symbol of the Tree of Life. Thus, the scene on the Karagodeuashkh plate also represented a Scythian form of the cult of the divine twins.

The divine nature of all the other beings represented on the Karagodeuashkh plate implied that the two hooded figures in the background of the scene could not have been eunuch priests and therefore might have instead represented mythological attendants of Artimpasa of unclear significance in the scene.

The Karagodeuashkh plate thus depicted a communion of Artimpasa with a pair of heroes which therefore represented concepts of eternal life and resurrection and divine legitimation of royal power.

Interpretation
These representations of Artimpasa have been interpreted as depicting the adoration or communion of Artimpasa and a god or a mortal, and more specifically as the granting of divine benediction to a king, or an investiture, or a sacred marriage. The  and the spherical vessels like the one depicted in the Sakhnova band were used for drinking sacred beverages consumed in religious rituals. The spherical vessels specifically were widely used in the rituals of Iranian peoples, and large numbers of them have been found in Scythian sites, and their ornamentation typically consisting of vegetal and solar imagery as well as their depiction in Scythian art where they are held or being offered to a goddess associate them with Artimpasa.

These depictions represent the male figure, who is often a standing youth of smaller stature than the goddess, as subordinate to Artimpasa, who remains seated. This artistic composition reflects a divine marriage of the goddess with a younger god, similar to the union of Kubeleya and Attis or of Aphroditē and Adōnis, or a deified mortal identified with a god or a hero, likely the Scythian forefather Dargatavah. These scenes represent this younger god receiving grace endowed by the goddess upon him after the communion. In some variants of this scene, the male partner of the goddess is bearded and is more imposing on horseback, which, if not simply a local artistic variation, reflected the increasing prominence of a warrior god in this ritual.

The image of the seated Artimpasa on the signet ring of Skula who held a mirror and a sceptre represented communion with the goddess as guaranteeing sovereignty in Scythian religion. The image of the Artimpasa on the ring was therefore a representation of her as a granter of sovereignty, with the ring having been inherited from generation to generation of the Scythian royal dynasty as a token of royal power, and Argotas was a former Scythian king from whom his descendant Skula inherited this ring. The ring did not feature any image of the male partner of the goddess because the kings were themselves considered to be these partners, with the Scythian royal investiture having been considered both a communion between man and the goddess as well as a marital union which elevated the king to the status of spouse of the goddess and granted him power through sexual intercourse with the goddess. This was also a reflection of Levantine influence on Artimpasa, since Mesopotamian equivalents of Aphroditē Ourania were sometimes represented together with the king in scenes represented sacred marriages, and the stability of royal power in Paphos was believed to be derived from intimate relations between Aphroditē, with whom the queen of Paphos was identified, and the king, who claimed descent from Aphroditē's lover Kinuras.

These scenes however had multiple interpretations, and the communion with the goddess might have also represented blessing of the worshipper with an promise of afterlife and future resurrection through communion with the goddess, as well as an endowment of the king with royal power, reflecting Artimpasa's role as a giver of power and victory, which also explains why all the variants of the scene of the seated goddess and a male partner were found in the tombs of Scythian nobility.

Clergy

References

Sources

 
 
 

Scythian mythology
Ancient LGBT history
Inanna
Abundance goddesses
Agricultural goddesses
Animal goddesses
Death goddesses
Earth goddesses
Fertility goddesses
Love and lust goddesses
Pastoral goddesses
Solar goddesses
War goddesses
Androgynous and hermaphroditic deities